IRSE may refer to:

 Indian Railway Service of Engineers,  a cadre of the Government of India responsible for managing the Civil Engineering Organisation of the Indian Railways.
 The Institution of Railway Signal Engineers, a UK-based professional institution for railway signalling and telecommunications.

See also
 Indian Railway Service of Signal Engineers (IRSSE)